Lãng Ngâm is a rural commune of Gia Bình District in Bắc Ninh Province, Vietnam.

References

Populated places in Bắc Ninh province